Quin Kruijsen (born 17 November 1990) is a Dutch former professional footballer who played as a midfielder.

Career
Born in Venlo, he made his professional debut for his hometown club on 19 January 2011, as part of a 2–1 defeat to FC Utrecht.

In March 2017, he joined German club lower league side VfR Fischeln.

References

External links
 Voetbal International profile 

Living people
1990 births
Footballers from Venlo
Association football midfielders
Dutch footballers
VVV-Venlo players
Fortuna Sittard players
Eredivisie players
Eerste Divisie players